Goodloe may refer to:

Goodloe, Virginia, an unincorporated community in Lee County

People with the name Goodloe
Abbe Carter Goodloe
Don S.S. Goodloe
Hart Goodloe
J. Mills Goodloe
William C. Goodloe
Goodloe Sutton